Justin Pierre Greene (born August 13, 1989) is an American retired basketball player and current coach. He played college basketball for the NCAA Division I Kent State Golden Flashes. On May 20, 2008, Greene committed to attend Kent State University. In his freshman season, Greene saw limited playing time, averaging 8.8 minutes per game and 2.2 points per game. His minutes per game increased to 28.1 in his sophomore season and his points per game also went up to 13.6 to go along 6.9 rebounds per game. In Greene's junior season, he averaged 15.4 points per game, 8.3 rebounds per game and 1.6 assists per game, which was good enough for him to be recognized as the Mid-American Conference Men's Basketball Player of the Year.

Professional career
Justin Greene played professionally for two seasons.  In 2014 he became a graduate assistant coach for Kent State University. On October 20, he was named an assistant coach for the Ohio Cardinals via Twitter.

References

External links
Czech League profile
Kent State profile

1989 births
Living people
American expatriate basketball people in Luxembourg
American expatriate basketball people in the Czech Republic
Kent State Golden Flashes men's basketball players
Small forwards
Musel Pikes players
BK NH Ostrava players
Sportspeople from Brooklyn
Basketball players from New York City
North American Premier Basketball coaches
Abraham Lincoln High School (Brooklyn) alumni
American men's basketball players